Kim Cheong-yong (born January 1, 1997, in Uiwang, Gyeonggi-do) is a South Korean sport shooter. He won a silver medal in boys' 10 m air pistol shooting at the 2014 Summer Youth Olympics in Nanjing, China, and eventually claimed a gold medal to a thunderous applause from the home crowd when South Korea hosted the Asian Games a month later. Kim is a member of the shooting club at Heung-deok High School in Uiwang under his personal coach Kim Seun-il.

Kim first came to a worldwide attention as a 17-year-old at the 2014 Summer Youth Olympics in Nanjing, China, where he fired a score of 201.2 to take the silver medal in the boys' 10 m air pistol, falling short to Ukraine's Pavlo Korostylov by a stalwart 3.6-point margin.

When his nation South Korea hosted the Asian Games one month later, Kim beat a star-studded field in the final, including his personal hero and the reigning World and Olympic champion Jin Jong-oh, to claim the gold medal on his senior debut in air pistol shooting, finishing with an astonishing record of 201.2.

References

External links

Nanjing 2014 Profile

1997 births
Living people
South Korean male sport shooters
Shooters at the 2014 Summer Youth Olympics
Shooters at the 2014 Asian Games
Asian Games gold medalists for South Korea
Asian Games medalists in shooting
Sportspeople from Gyeonggi Province
Medalists at the 2014 Asian Games
20th-century South Korean people
21st-century South Korean people